Pleomorphic fibromas of the skin usually present in adults, with a slight preponderance in women.

See also 
 Pleomorphic lipoma
 List of cutaneous conditions

References 

Dermal and subcutaneous growths